Mustafaabad is a small village in District Bhakkar of Punjab 9 km east of Dullewala. The former name of the village was Jhammat Janubi. Its total population is about 5,000 people. Four main tribes have inhabited the town over 200 years: Khayara, Naich, Jhammat, and Hajam. People are very conservative and mostly practice Hanafi Maslak. The primary source of income is agriculture and the main agricultural crop is grain. The mother language is Saraiki.

References

 http://www.maplandia.com/pakistan/punjab/mainwali/bhakkar/accommodation/mustafaabad-jhammat-janubi/
 http://www.maplandia.com/pakistan/punjab/mainwali/bhakkar/accommodation/mustafaabad-dullewala/

Populated places in Bhakkar District